San Pedro de Larcay is one of 11 districts of the Sucre Province in the Ayacucho region in Peru.

Administrative division
The populated places in the district are:
 San Pedro de Larcay
 Wallacha
 Chicha (San Pablo de Chicha)
 fundo Curita
 Saywa
 Hueccopampa
 Ccehuani
 Sura Sura (San Martín de Porras de Sora Sora)
 Huacuylla
 Q'ara Q'ara
 Huascoto
 Cuchallo
 Susuma
 Rumiwasi
 Ccotaccua
 Cuchopampamnjkhob
 Rayusqa
 Liapucro
 Cullupallcca
 Puka Corral
 Sairosa
 Hatun Urqu
 Ccerencha
 sicuani
 Chuñunchana
 Ccaccentalla

Population
The population of San Pedro de Larcay (2005 census) is 1,175 people, 600 men and 575 women.

See also 
 Qarwarasu

References

External links 
 https://web.archive.org/web/20120302112033/http://www.cuspel.pe/es/sanpedrodelarcay/